The term oyster reef refers to dense aggregations of oysters that form large colonial communities. Because oyster larvae need to settle on hard substrates, new oyster reefs may form on stone or other hard marine debris. Eventually the oyster reef will propagate by spat settling on the shells of older or nonliving oysters. The dense aggregations of oysters are often referred to as an oyster reef, oyster bed, oyster bank, oyster bottom, or oyster bar interchangeably. These terms are not well defined and often regionally restricted.

Degradation of oyster reefs 

Oyster reefs were once common in estuaries around the world. Within the last century there have been significant declines in the extent and condition of oyster reefs globally, driven by overharvesting of oysters for food provision and lime production, and coastal degradation.  Boat wakes can cause oyster shells to be swept toward the shore, where they build up over time into exposed piles in which any remaining oysters will desiccate and die.  These piles may also isolate littoral areas from tides and currents, leading to further habitat degradation.  Laboratory experiments suggest that in areas of faster flow and higher amounts of suspended sediment, as would be seen in a high-traffic channel, the cyprid larvae of barnacles may outcompete larval oysters in settling onto substrate, a prerequisite for completing their respective life cycles.

In the United States Crassostrea virginica, the eastern oyster, was a major reef builder in the Chesapeake Bay until the late 19th century. Because of overfishing, environmental degradation, and disease, populations of C. virginica underwent a drastic reduction in population size. There is an established pattern connecting human fishing practices, such as dredging, to oyster population collapse across the globe. Besides the collapse of C. virginica reefs on the east coast of the United States, populations of the Olympia oyster, Ostrea lurida, on the western coast of the United States and the Sydney rock oyster, Saccostrea glomerata, of eastern Australia have both been heavily impacted by harmful fishing practices. While most research has focused on temperate zones it is likely that significant declines have also been observed in tropical regions.

Oyster reef ecology 

Natural oyster reefs are composed of living and dead oyster shells and provide important habitat for various species. For example, the complex three-dimensional interstitial spaces within oyster reefs provide refugia for prey or juvenile species, which increases prey biomass and thereby enhances trophic transfer. Oyster reefs also stabilize shorelines by promoting sediment deposition and buffering wave energy, thereby allowing other habitats such as sea grass beds and marsh areas to form while simultaneously decreasing erosion of the shoreline.

Ecosystem services 

The filter feeding behavior of oysters can buffer against environmental degradation caused by human-induced eutrophication of estuary systems. Oysters feed on suspended phytoplankton and other organic matter. Disruption of the filter feeding by oysters can lead to a decrease in the elimination of organic matter from the water column and increase phytoplankton abundance. This in turn may lead to seasonal anoxia, which could increase mortality for other estuary animals, such as fish.

Oyster reefs can also impact the carbon sequestration and excess nutrient uptake. Oyster reefs also stabilize shorelines by promoting sediment deposition and buffering wave energy, thereby allowing other habitats such as sea grass beds and marsh areas to form while simultaneously decreasing erosion of the shoreline.

Restoration 

Oyster reef restoration has accelerated in recent decades. Oyster reef restoration projects often place the sanitized shells of dead oysters, concrete, or limestone pieces on a soft bottom to encourage oyster spat settlement. Restoration of intertidal eastern oyster reefs can match natural densities of oysters and mud crabs, and recover oyster stability in about 6 years. Additional benefits to restoring these habitats includes suppressing phytoplankton blooms via increasing filter feeding behavior, increase nutrient sequestration and dentrification rates, increase nekton biomass, and potentially increase commercial fishery value. However, data on previously implemented restoration projects can be difficult to access, hindering future restoration efforts.

See also 

 Rudists – extinct group of major reef-building bivalves in the Mesozoic Era

References

External links 
 Animation of Reef Development from The Nature Conservatory Australia
 South Carolina Oyster Recycling and Enhancement Oyster Biology & Ecology

Oysters
Reefs